Cleberson Silva Andrade or simply Cleberson (born September 30, 1988 in Rio de Janeiro), is a Brazilian central defender. He currently plays for Santa Cruz on loan from Cruzeiro.

Contract
Santa Cruz (Loan) 1 January 2008 to 31 May 2008
Cruzeiro 29 April 2006 to 23 April 2009

External links
 eusoubahia
 CBF

1988 births
Living people
Esporte Clube Bahia players
Cruzeiro Esporte Clube players
Santa Cruz Futebol Clube players
Association football defenders
Footballers from Rio de Janeiro (city)
Brazilian footballers